Kent West was a federal electoral district (or riding) represented in the House of Commons of Canada from 1904 to 1917. It was located in the province of Ontario. This riding was created in 1903 when Kent riding was divided into two ridings, Kent West and Kent East.

The west riding consisted of the townships of Dover East, Dover West, Harwich, Raleigh, Romney and Tilbury East, the city of Chatham, the town of Blenheim, and the part of the village of Tilbury lying in the county of Kent.

The electoral district was abolished in 1914 when it was merged back into Kent riding.

Election results

|}

|}

|}

See also 

 List of Canadian federal electoral districts
 Past Canadian electoral districts

External links 
Riding history from the Library of Parliament

Former federal electoral districts of Ontario